Vahram is a variant name of the divinity Verethragna in Zoroastrianism. Variants are Vehram, Bahram, Behram, Balram.

Vahram is also a common given name for Armenian males. Vahramian, derived from Vahram, is an Armenian family name. 

Vahram may refer to:

Given name
Vahram Alazan (1903-1966), Armenian poet, writer
Vahram Kevorkian (1887-1911), football player of Armenian descent
Vahram Pahlavouni (967–1045), Armenian army commander (sparapet) and Prince in Bagratuni Armenia
Vahram Papazian or Papazyan (1888-1968), Armenian actor classical actor
Vahram Sahakian (born 1964), Armenian dramatist, film director and actor
Vahram Sargsyan (born 1981), Armenian-Canadian composer and choral conductor
Vahram Zaryan French-Armenian modern mime artist, dancer, director and choreograph

Family name
Vartan Vahramian, Iranian-Armenian music artist and painter

Places
Vahramaberd, a town in the Shirak Province of Armenia
Vahramashen Church, a church in Armenia

See also
Bahram (disambiguation)
Bahram (name)
Balram
 Behram
Megasthenes' Herakles

Armenian masculine given names